Hugh Lawson may refer to:

Hugh Lawson (British politician) (1912–1997), British Common Wealth Party politician, Member of Parliament 1944–45
Hugh Lawson, 6th Baron Burnham (1931–2005), British newspaper executive
Hugh Lawson (jazz pianist) (1935–1997), American jazz pianist
Hugh Lawson (judge) (born 1941), U.S. federal judge

See also